Cosmic storm may refer to:

 Cosmic ray burst
 Geomagnetic storm, the interaction of the Sun's outburst with Earth's magnetic field smn
 Interacting galaxies
 Coronal mass ejection
 Solar flare
 Nebula

Popular culture
 The Cosmic Storm, a Fantastic Four book based on the movie